Jussi Linnamo (13 October 1929 – 18 May 2004) was a Finnish politician. He was the Minister of Trade and Industry in 1972.

See also
 List of Cabinet Ministers from Finland by ministerial portfolio

References

1929 births
2004 deaths
Ministers of Trade and Industry of Finland
Finnish diplomats
Politicians from Vyborg